Mohammad Kheirkhah Zoyari (born 24 June 1986), also known as Moe Zoyari, is an Iranian-American photographer. He has won three Pictures of the Year International Awards.

Career 
Zoyari started his work as a photographer at the age of 14. After covering Iran's nuclear program, earthquakes, and political turmoil, he covered events in the Middle East, Europe and the United States. He left Iran after the turbulent aftermath of the Iranian presidential election, 2009 and went to Afghanistan for 44 days to be an embedded journalist with the U.S. Army.

Zoyari worked for BBC Persian from 2003 to 2004 and United Press International from 2005 to 2015. He is now represented by Redux Pictures. Moe was invited to The White House by President Obama, and The First Lady in 2015. His photographs have been published in Newsweek, Time, and Le Figaro. He has documented stories in more than 52 countries to be a voice for the deliberately silenced and preferably unheard people.

Awards

 2007: Picture of The Year, Award of excellence, General News Reporting, Pictures of the Year International 65, Missouri School of Journalism
 2012: Best photographer of the year, PDNedu
 2019: Reuters photojournalism grant

Exhibitions

Solo exhibitions
 Forgotten Colors Sunnyvale Public Library, Sunnyvale, CA, 2010
  Iranian women Mah-e-Mehr Gallery in Tehran, Iran, July 2007
 Photo Exhibition in Qazvin, Iran 2006

Group exhibitions
 Just For Foreign Policy, New York, 2005
 30 Years of Iranian Photography, Monnaie de Paris, 2009
  Today's Bam, A Photo exhibition on [Bam Earthquake] in Tehran Iran

Publications
 Exile. Self-published, Blurb, 2012. . Work from Iran, India, Afghanistan, Turkey, Saudi Arabia, France, Italy, Germany, and the U.S.

References

External links
 Photos of Zoyari on United Press International
 An interview with Empty Kingdom
 An interview with Feature Shoot
 Article on The Artbo about work in Afghanistan
 Photo stories from Afghanistan, Iran, Saudi Arabia, Thailand and Cuba on LensCulture

American photographers
Living people
1986 births
Iranian photojournalists
People from Qazvin
Iranian emigrants to the United States